"La Lega" is an Italian folk song from the Emilian people, sung by the rice-growers of the Po Valley. It is the symbol of the revolt of the agricultural workers against their bosses at the end of the 19th century, when the unions were starting to be created.

It may be heard in Bernardo Bertolucci's film 1900 when the farmers, under Anna's leadership, start to demonstrate against the expulsion of the farmers because their wealthy landowners do not respect their contracts.

Lyrics

(*)An alternative line to 'Per amor de nostri figli Socialismo noi vogliamo' 
which is widely used is:
'Per amor de nostri figli In lega ci mettiamo'

English Version
An English singing version is:

1. You say we’re only women, But we are not afraid,

For the sake of our children, For the sake of our children

You say we’re only women, But we are not afraid,

For the sake of our children, Our union will be made Hey!

(Refrain) Oli, oli olla, And the union it will grow

And we the socialistis, And we the socialistis,

Oli, oli olla, And the union it will grow

And we the socialistis, want liberty right now

2. But liberty will not come, Because we’re not united

The blacklegs with the bosses, The blacklegs with the bosses,

But liberty will not come, Because we’re not united

The blacklegs with the bosses, They must be defeated.

3. You say we’re only women, But we are not afraid
 
We have our defences. We have our defences.
 
You say we’re only women, But we are not afraid

We have our defences. Our tongues are sharp as blades, Hey

4. You men rich and boastful, The pride of all the nation,
 
Forget your self-importance, forget your self-importance
 
You men rich and boastful, The pride of all the nation,

Forget your self-importance, And make a big donation

References 

(1) Pivato, Stefano. Bella Ciao: Canto e Politica Nella Storia d'Italia. Bari Editori Laterza, 2007, pp. 82–83.

Italian folk songs
Culture in Emilia-Romagna
Songwriter unknown
19th-century songs